= Sturmberg =

Mountain in Germany

Coordinates: 47°53′N 9°21′E

Highest point
- Elevation: 770 m (2,530 ft)

Geography
- Location: Baden-Württemberg, Germany

Sturmberg is a mountain of Baden-Württemberg, Germany.
